Hurricane is the third studio album by American R&B recording artist Eric Benét. It was released on June 21, 2005, on Friday Records, with distributing by Reprise Records. It is the follow-up to his second album A Day in the Life (1999) and follows the shelving of his Better and Better project for Warner Bros. Records. Recorded at various recording studios, the album was written and produced by Benét with several other producers, including Walter Afanasieff, Michael Carney, Hod David, David Foster, George Nash, Jr., and Demonté Posey.

Background 
In 2001, Benét was expected to release his third studio album Better and Better on Warner Bros. Records but the label rejected to release this album and forced him to stay in the R&B genre. Due to the controversy about music style and creative freedom, Benét changed to Reprise-distributed label Friday Records and began recording his next album Hurricane. Several songs from Better and Better reappeared on other studio albums by Benét: "I Wanna Be Loved" and "Pretty Baby" were released on Hurricane. The songs "Spanish Fly" and "Sing to Me" would later appear on his 2008 album Love & Life. The title track "Better & Better" would later be re-recorded by Lalah Hathaway for her 2004 album Outrun the Sky, while "Better and Better" an "Trippin" would later be included as an iTunes bonus track on Benét's 2010 album Lost in Time.

Recording 
Recording sessions for the album took place at various recording locations, including the Hit Factory in New York, New York, Bowery Digital, Chalice Studios, Ocean Way Recording, The Studio, Warner Bros. Sound Stage, and Westlake Audio in Los Angeles, California, Chartmaker Studios, Drew's Groove Studios, Panic Room, and Soundstage Studio in Nashville, Tennessee, Jade Studios and Jupiter Studios in Franklin, Tennessee, and Eastman Scoring Stage in Burbank, California. Production was handled by Benét and several other record producers, including Walter Afanasieff, Michael Carney, Hod David, Dave Foster, George Nash, Jr., and Demonté Posey.

Composition 
Hurricane incorporates musical elements of gospel and contributions from jazz musicians Roy Hargrove, Chris Botti, and Viktor Krauss. A departure from the jazzy, groove-based urban sound of Benét's previous work, the album features an adult contemporary radio format style, with sweeping strings, layered vocals, and nimble acoustic guitars. Rashod D. Ollison of The Baltimore Sun likened Hurricane to Christopher Cross rather than R. Kelly.

Reception 

AllMusic writer Stephen Thomas Erlewine gave it three-and-a-half out of four stars and commented that "The quiet storm is well performed but dull, yet the Prince-styled numbers are engaging, melodic, and nimble, strong showcases for Benet's mellow skills". Mojo gave the album three out of five stars and called it "a very palatable collection of self-penned confessional songs". Laura Checkoway of Vibe called it "an uneven mix of simplistic sentimentality", stating "Reflective and repentant at times, Hurricane is more likely to sing you to sleep than knock you off your feet". The Washington Post commented favorably on the album's themes of "healing and redemption", and stated "The spiritual tone often brings out the best in [Eric Benet]'s supple tenor on 'In The End' and other tracks".

Track listing 

Notes
  denotes co-producer

Personnel 
Credits for Hurricane adapted from AllMusic.

Performers and musicians

 Spanky Alford – guitar, soloist 
 Eric Benét – audio production, vocal bass, percussion, producer, vocals 
 Chris Boardman – string arrangements 
 Chris Botti – soloist, trumpet 
 Randall Bowland – guitar    
 David Campbell – string arrangements 
 Vinnie Colaiuta – drums 
 Larry Corbett – cello 
 Nathan East – bass 
 Larry Gold – string arrangements 
 Anthony Johnson – drums 
 Jef Lee Johnson – guitar 
 Viktor Krauss – bass 
 Frank Lacy – horn 
 Michael Landau – electric guitar 
 Lucia Micarelli – violin 
 Brian Frazier Moore – drums 
 Dan Needham – drums 
 Pino Palladino – bass 
 Dean Parks – guitar 
 Van Dyke Parks – arranger, conductor 
 Tim Pierce – guitar 
 James Poyser – keyboards 
 William Ross – arranger, conductor 
 Jacques Schwarz-Bart – horn 
 Norbert Stachel – alto and tenor saxophones 

Technical

 Walter Afanasieff – arranger, audio production, keyboards, producer, programming 
 Steve B. – engineer 
 Tim Blixseth – executive producer 
 Lee Bridges – assistant 
 Michael Carney – audio production, producer 
 Hod David – audio production, bass, drums, guitar, mixing, producer 
 Kevin "KD" Davis – mixing 
 Rich Davis – production coordination 
 Neil Devor – engineer 
 Andy Duncan – audio production, engineer, guitar, mixing, producer 
 Danny Duncan – engineer 
 Olivia Fischa – make-up 
 David Foster – arranger, keyboards, producer, string arrangements  
 Humberto Gatica – audio production, engineer, mixing, producer 
 Bernie Grundman – mastering 
 Dawn Haynes – stylist 
 Kaori Kinoshita – assistant engineer 
 Emanuel Kiriakou – digital editing, engineer, programming 
 Manny Marroquin – mixing 
 George Nash, Jr. – audio production, producer 
 Mike O'Connor – engineer 
 Juan Patino – mixing, percussion 
 Csaba Petocz – engineer 
 Kathleen Philpott – design 
 Demonté Posey – audio production, keyboards, organ, producer 
 Drew Ramsey – audio production 
 Alejandro Rodriguez – engineer 
 Alex Rodriguez – assistant engineer 
 Aldo Ruggiero – assistant 
 Jochem van der Saag – programming 
 Shannon Sanders – audio production, organ, piano, producer, programming, synthesizer 
 F. Reid Shippen – mixing 
 John Sneltz – engineer 
 Jorge Vivo – engineer 
 Stephen Walker – art direction, design 
 Shelley Wiseman – production coordination 
 Joe Wohlmuth – engineer 
 Patrick Woodward – engineer, mixing 
 Andrew Wyatt – engineer

Charts

Release history

References

External links 
 
 Hurricane at Discogs

2005 albums
Eric Benét albums
Reprise Records albums